Paul Linger (20 December 1974 – 1 October 2021) was an English professional footballer who played in the Football League as a midfielder for Charlton Athletic, Leyton Orient and Brighton & Hove Albion. He went on to play non-League football for clubs including Welling United, Billericay Town, 
Braintree Town, Purfleet/Thurrock, 
East Thurrock United, 
Wingate and Finchley, 
Chelmsford City, 
Redbridge, 
and Dover Athletic.

Linger represented the United Kingdom at the 2005 Maccabiah Games.

On 1 October 2021, Linger died of pancreatic cancer at the age of 46. He was diagnosed with the disease earlier in the year.

References

External links
 

1974 births
2021 deaths
Footballers from Stepney
English footballers
Association football midfielders
Charlton Athletic F.C. players
Leyton Orient F.C. players
Brighton & Hove Albion F.C. players
Welling United F.C. players
Billericay Town F.C. players
Braintree Town F.C. players
Thurrock F.C. players
East Thurrock United F.C. players
Wingate & Finchley F.C. players
Chelmsford City F.C. players
Redbridge F.C. players
Dover Athletic F.C. players
London Lions F.C. players
English Football League players
National League (English football) players
Isthmian League players
English Jews
Jewish footballers
Maccabiah Games competitors for Great Britain
Maccabiah Games footballers
Competitors at the 2005 Maccabiah Games
Jewish British sportspeople
Deaths from cancer in England
Deaths from pancreatic cancer